Faith Torrez (born December 9, 2003) is an American artistic gymnast. She became a member of the United States national team in 2020 and made her international debut at 2020 Gymnix International, winning two golds and a bronze.

Career

Junior 
Torrez began gymnastics in 2008. As a junior, she competed at the Women's Junior Olympic National Championships in 2016, 2017, and 2018. She won gold on floor exercise in 2017. In 2018, she won all-around and balance beam gold, as well as floor exercise silver. In 2018, she competed at the Nastia Liukin Cup for the first time and won all-around bronze. She was the top scorer on floor with 9.600; her highest score of the competition was a 9.675 on vault.

Senior

2019 
Torrez became a senior in 2019. She competed at the Nastia Liukin Cup in March, finishing seventh all-around. At the American Classic in June, Torrez won all-around gold, finishing first on vault, second on uneven bars and floor exercise, and third on balance beam. In July at the GK US Classic, she finished sixth on balance beam and eighth all-around. At the US Gymnastics Championships in August, Torrez finished 14th all-around.

2020 
Torrez was added to the senior national team on March 3, 2020. She made her international debut on March 6–8 at Gymnix International. With teammates Lilly Lippeatt, MyKayla Skinner and Emily Lee, she won team gold. Individually, she captured balance beam gold with a score of 13.966 and uneven bars bronze with a score of 12.966.

NCAA

2022–2023 season 
Torrez made her collegiate debut on January 7, 2023 at the Super 16 Invitational.  She competed on three events, the uneven bars (9.875), balance beam (9.900), and floor exercise (9.950).  Her scores helped contribute towards Oklahoma's first place finish.  Additionally she co-won the title on floor exercise.  As a result she was named Big-12 newcomer of the week.

Competitive History

References 

2003 births
Living people
American female artistic gymnasts
People from Libertyville, Illinois
Sportspeople from Illinois
Oklahoma Sooners women's gymnasts